This is a list of rural localities in Ivanovo Oblast. Ivanovo Oblast (Ivanovskaya oblast) is a federal subject of Russia (an oblast). It had a population of 1,061,651 as of the 2010 Russian Census. Its three largest cities are Ivanovo (the administrative center), Kineshma, and Shuya. The principal center of tourism is Plyos. The Volga River flows through the northern part of the oblast.

Verkhnelandekhovsky District 
Rural localities in Verkhnelandekhovsky District:

 Abrosovo

Yuzhsky District 
Rural localities in Yuzhsky District:

 Kholuy

Zavolzhsky District 
Rural localities in Zavolzhsky District:

 Porozovo

See also 
 
 Lists of rural localities in Russia

References 

Ivanovo Oblast